The Suell Winn House is a historic house at 72-74 Elm Street in Wakefield, Massachusetts.  The house was built c. 1805 for Major Suell Winn, a local farmer, and is one of the best representatives of Federal-style architecture in Wakefield.  It is a -story wood-frame structure, with two interior chimneys, a five-bay facade, and an elegant doorway with sidelight windows and an architrave.  An ell extends the house to the right.  Winn, a native of nearby Burlington, was killed crossing the railroad that divided his landholdings, after attending a town meeting where he protested the need for improved crossing signals at that location.

The house was listed on the National Register of Historic Places in 1989.

See also
National Register of Historic Places listings in Wakefield, Massachusetts
National Register of Historic Places listings in Middlesex County, Massachusetts

References

Houses on the National Register of Historic Places in Wakefield, Massachusetts
Federal architecture in Massachusetts
Houses completed in 1813
Houses in Wakefield, Massachusetts